Cerys Matthews  (born 11 April 1969) is a Welsh singer, songwriter, author, and broadcaster. She was a founding member of Welsh rock band Catatonia and a leading figure in the "Cool Cymru" movement of the late 1990s.

Matthews programmes and hosts a weekly music show on BBC Radio 6 Music, a weekly blues show on BBC Radio 2, and a weekly show on BBC Radio 4 'Add To Playlist' which won the Prix Italia and Prix Europa 2022.  She also makes documentaries for television and radio and was a roving reporter for The One Show. She founded 'The Good Life Experience', a festival of culture and the great outdoors in Flintshire in 2014, and is author of Hook, Line and  Singer published by Penguin Books and children's stories Tales from the Deep and Gelert, A Man's Best Friend, published by Gomer.

Her illustrated version of Dylan Thomas's Under Milk Wood is released November 2022 published by Weidenfeld and Nicolson.

Early life
Matthews was born in Cardiff, the second of four children. The family moved to Swansea when she was seven. She went to Bryn Y Mor Welsh language school until 11 years of age, then attended St Michael's School, Llanelli. She then attended Ysgol Bro Gwaun comprehensive school when she lived in the Pembrokeshire village of TrefinShe is fluent in English, Welsh, Spanish, and French. She has cited her childhood heroes as being Pippi Longstocking and writers William Butler Yeats and Dylan Thomas.

She learned to play the guitar at the age of nine, sang Welsh folk songs and taught herself traditional songs from all over the globe including blues and Irish folk songs. She was a member of the West Glamorgan Youth Orchestra. She had a stint in Spain as a nanny, where she learned to speak Catalan.

Career

Catatonia

Catatonia were formed in 1992, after Matthews met Mark Roberts. She subsequently sang lead vocals on, and co-wrote the music and lyrics for, the band's hits. Songs she co-wrote included "You've Got a Lot to Answer For", "Mulder and Scully", "Dead from the Waist Down", and "Road Rage". Matthews also played guitar on the earlier material before second guitarist Owen Powell joined the band. She also performed a single with the band Space named "The Ballad of Tom Jones", which tells the story of two lovers who want to kill each other, but then hear a Tom Jones song that defuses their homicidal feelings. Matthews later collaborated with Jones to record a version of Frank Loesser's "Baby, It's Cold Outside" on Jones's 1999 album Reload. Matthews was voted the "Sexiest Female in Rock" in a 1999 readers' poll in the now defunct magazine Melody Maker.

After Catatonia's rise to fame with their second album International Velvet, and subsequent success with Equally Cursed and Blessed, the band returned in 2001 with their fourth studio album Paper Scissors Stone. In September 2001 the band officially split.

2000s
Matthews joined the Pet Shop Boys on the Pyramid Stage at Glastonbury in June 2000, performing a duet of their hit "What Have I Done to Deserve This?". In December 2001, she returned to the recording studio for the first time since Catatonia split up. She recorded a song in both English and Welsh for the pre-school cartoon series Sali Mali. She provided guest vocals on the track "Cyclops Rock", from US alternative rock band They Might Be Giants 2001 album Mink Car. Her line was originally supposed to be provided by Joe Strummer of the Clash. Cerys went on to co-write "Gypsy Song" with Strummer on her Cockahoop album released by Rough Trade in 2003.

Matthews moved to Nashville, Tennessee in 2001. On her arrival she began playing with Bucky Baxter, who had played lap steel guitar for Bob Dylan and Ryan Adams. She had already collected seventy-six traditional folk songs with the idea of making an album of folk covers. Her debut album, Cockahoop, ended up consisting mainly of her own songs. It was recorded in seven months and appeared on Blanco y Negro Records in the United Kingdom in May 2003. Whilst recording this album she met Seth Riddle, whom she married in Pembrokeshire on 22 February 2003. She toured the album around Britain with minimal promotion as she was several months pregnant at the time. The album's Stateside Records release followed in October 2004.

In December 2005, Matthews recorded a version of Len Barry's 1960s UK and US top 10 hit "1-2-3" in Nashville. She released it as a download-single with all profits going to a children's charity. In early 2006, Matthews introduced material from her then upcoming album at SXSW in Austin, Texas.

In 2006, Matthews conducted a short tour of the UK to promote her second solo album, Never Said Goodbye. The album was preceded by the single "Open Roads". Band members included Kevin Teel on guitar, Ben Elkins playing keyboards, Mason Neely on drums, and Jeff Irwin playing bass. She headlined Cardiff's Big Weekend festival. During September and October 2006, Matthews embarked on a UK and Ireland tour, during which she played tracks from her first two solo albums as well as three Catatonia hits. She also embarked upon a short acoustic Welsh tour in November 2006 before returning to Nashville for Christmas.

Matthews appeared on the 2007 series of ITV's I'm a Celebrity...Get Me Out of Here!, which aired from 12 to 30 November. She was voted off one day before the final episode, coming fourth behind Jason "J" Brown, Janice Dickinson and eventual winner Christopher Biggins. Matthews became involved with fellow contestant Marc Bannerman after the show, but they split four months later. Matthews appeared at the live Guilty Pleasures concert at the Hackney Empire, London in 2007. She performed the Bonnie Tyler hit "Total Eclipse of the Heart" and the Dolly Parton/Kenny Rogers duet "Islands in the Stream" along with Terry Hall and the BBC Concert Orchestra.

In an interview on the eve of the launch of her Welsh mini-album Awyren = Aeroplane, Matthews confirmed she had divorced from Riddle and temporarily moved back to her farm in Pembrokeshire. Awyren = Aeroplane won her the 'Contemporary Composition' award in the National Eisteddfod. The award had been resurrected and presented for the first time since 1936. In 2007 Matthews became Vice-President of the Welsh homelessness charity Shelter Cymru. She also accepted a role of Performing Arts Ambassador for Linden Lodge School, Wimbledon in the same year.

Matthews joined the Welsh band Manic Street Preachers onstage at The O2 on 28 February 2008 to sing the female vocals of their 2007 hit "Your Love Alone Is Not Enough". She replaced Nina Persson in both the awards ceremony (within indigO2) and at the following 'Big Gig' live show (within The O2 Arena).

From November 2008, Matthews sat in for Stephen Merchant and Marc Riley on BBC 6 Music and went on to present George Lamb's slot in April 2009. In May 2009 she presented show A Month of Sundays With... Cerys Matthews. She then covered for Nemone on 6 Music from July 2009 while Nemone was on maternity leave.

Matthews began maternity leave from November 2009 and had to finish presenting the show a month early. In April 2010, Matthews returned to 6 Music to present a weekend show on Sunday mornings. She produces and presents radio documentaries and shows, including Hook Line and Singer, where she shared her love of fishing on Radio 4.

Matthews released her first CD in two years in October 2009. The album, titled Don't Look Down, was released in two versions, one in English and the other in Welsh (the title of the Welsh edition was Paid Edrych i Lawr). It was recorded in Providence, Rhode Island, Nashville, Seattle and London, and coincided with a two-week UK tour in October.

Since 2010
Matthews has covered Glastonbury Festival for both BBC Television and BBC 6 Music, she wrote and presented a BBC Two programme on poetry and presented TV documentaries on singer Dorothy Squires, the Mississippi River and Cuba. She wrote and presented a documentary on early blues players such as Memphis Minnie, children's character Pippi Longstocking, Mahalia Jackson and the celebrated British blues label 'Blue Horizon'. She has presented a documentary for BBC Radio 2 on Maida Vale studios. She frequently contributes to BBC Radio 4 programmes such as Feedback, Frontrow, Loose Ends and Saturday Live, also writing a column for world music magazine Songlines. She has curated festivals for the Tate Modern, the Shetland theatre and Womex.

In 2010, Matthews released Tir (in Welsh: 'territory' or 'land'), a collection of traditional Welsh songs, and of photographs from her family archive from the 1880s to 1940s of people at work and play. They included "Calon Lân", "Cwm Rhondda", "Migldi-Magldi" (sung as a duet with Bryn Terfel), "Myfanwy" and "Sosban Fach". This is the third release on her own label, Rainbow City.

Explorer is Matthews's fourth solo album (2011). In both selecting and writing the songs she delved into the influence of both the music she has heard round the globe, and the places she had visited. Recorded over seven days, the album from the outset had no pre-determined sound or calculated format. On the album she incorporates a little Spanish, Scottish, Irish, Welsh, and American sensibilities, styles, and genres. In April 2011, a video was released through Matthews's official YouTube Page of the lead single from Explorer, "Sweet Magnolia".

Matthews played the Isle of Wight and Hay festivals in 2012, the latter with a Woody Guthrie tribute show, and collaborated with artists such as Arun Ghosh, Tunde Jegede, Attab Haddad, Frank Moon and the London Bulgarian Choir. 2012 also saw her play music from her collection of Welsh traditional songs Tir, with Ballet Cymru, ending in a show in Sadler's Wells, and a nomination for a Theatre Critics Award 2012. She produced and arranged Christmas album Baby, It's Cold Outside (2012) to much acclaim, recognised by the Sunday Times as an "essential seasonal album". Matthews played UK literary festivals including Dartington, Chester, Hay and Edinburgh and released an album of traditional Welsh reels and songs, Hullabaloo. Matthews sang Patsy Cline's "Crazy" and Dylan's "Blowin' in the Wind" as part of the memorial service for esteemed War correspondent Marie Colvin, in May 2012. Also in 2012, Matthews appeared as a celebrity guest mentor for Tom Jones's team on the first series of the UK version of The Voice.

In 2014, Matthews co-founded an interactive festival, The Good Life Experience, with Charlie and Caroline Gladstone, held every September on the Gladstone estate in Hawarden, Flintshire near the Cheshire border. It is a festival which celebrates the great outdoors, with abseiling, campfires, axe throwing, foraging, talk on survival, as well as cultural activities, crafts, books and music.

Awards and recognitions
Matthews won gold at the 2013 Sony Radio Academy Awards, winning in the 'Music Broadcaster of the year' category. Baby It's Cold Outside, released for Christmas 2013 on the Rainbow City label, is a selection of Christmas carols and classic Christmas songs all arranged and produced by Matthews using instruments such as Chinese temple blocks, oud, celeste and coconut shells.

Matthews won a 'St David Award' – for her contribution to culture in 2014 – run by the Welsh government, in its inaugural year, 2014.
She was appointed Member of the Order of the British Empire (MBE) in the 2014 Birthday Honours for services to music.

In July 2014 Matthews was awarded an honorary degree from Swansea University.

Matthews won the Best Presenter Music award at the Audio Production Awards on 23 November 2016.

In 2017 she was a guest presenter on the BBC's coverage of the Royal Welsh Show, along with Andi Oliver and Omar Hamdi. On 14 May 2018, Matthews took over from Paul Jones as the presenter of The Blues Show on BBC Radio 2.

In 2022 Matthews made a pilot for a new BBC Radio 4 music programme called 'Add To Playlist' with Jeffrey Boakye. This emerged as a weekly Friday night show which Cerys and Jeffrey  present and direct musically, production is by Jerome Weatherald. Add To Playlist went on to win both the  The Prix Italia and Prix Europa in the music radio category in 2022. 

In 2019 Matthews was one of the three judges for the 2020 Countryfile Calendar, sold in aid of Children in Need.

Personal life
Matthews has two sons and a daughter. She took her 9- and 12-year-old sons and husband to hike to base camp Everest in 2019. 
Matthews married her second husband, Steve Abbott, who also has 2 children, in 2012 and they live in West London.

Discography

Catatonia

As a solo artist
Studio albums
Cockahoop (UK No. 30) (Blanco y Negro – 2003)
Never Said Goodbye (Rough Trade – 2006)
Awyren = Aeroplane (mini-album) (My Kung Fu 030 – 2007)
Don't Look Down (Rainbow City Recordings – 2009)
Tir (Rainbow City Recordings – 2010)
Explorer (Rainbow City Recordings – 2011)
Baby It's Cold Outside (Rainbow City Recordings − 2012)
Hullabaloo (Rainbow City Recordings – 2013)
Dylan Thomas: A Child's Christmas, Poems and Tiger Eggs (Marvels of the Universe – 2014)
We Come from the Sun with the Hidden Orchestra and 10 poets (Decca Records – 2021)

Singles
 "The Ballad of Tom Jones" (with Space) (1998, UK No. 4)
 "Caught in the Middle" (2003, UK No. 47)
 "1-2-3" (2005)
 "Open Roads" (2006, UK No. 53)
 "Some Kind of Wonderful" (with Aled Jones) (2007)
 "Arlington Way" (Rainbow City Recordings − 2009)
 "Into The Blue"/"Mae Angen Llong Ar Gapten" (Rainbow City Recordings − 2010)
 "Sweet Magnolia" (Rainbow City Recordings − 2011)

Other appearances
Appearances on other original recordings
 Space – Tin Planet, duetting on "The Ballad of Tom Jones" (1998)
 Tom Jones – Reload, on "Baby, It's Cold Outside" (1999)
 They Might Be Giants – Mink Car, guest vocals on "Cyclops Rock" (2001)
 Aled Jones – Reasons to Believe, duetting on "Some Kind of Wonderful" (2007)
 The Fron Male Voice Choir – Voices of the Valley: Home, singing "Calon Lan" (2008)
 MAVIS presents Candi Staton & Cerys Matthews, singing "Nemesis Required" (2010)

Appearances on compilations
Brand New Boots and Panties!! (2001) – contributed "If I Was With a Woman"
Listen to Bob Dylan: A Tribute (2005) – contributed "I Believe in You", a Bob Dylan song from Slow Train Coming
Hands Across the Water (2006) – contributed "An Occasional Song"
Songs for the Young at Heart (2007) – contributed "White Horses", the theme song to The White Horses
Over the Rainbow (2007) – contributed "Secret Love"

Bibliography
Hook, Line and Singer, Matthews' collection of singalong classics published by Penguin, became a top 3 Sunday Times bestseller in 2013. The book includes personal anecdotes and song histories. Song examples are "Let's Go Fly a Kite", "Oh Susannah", and "Swing Low Sweet Chariot".
Tales from the Deep, (2011) Gwasg Gomer, Wales: Gomer Press Limited,  Nominated for a People's Choice Award.
Gelert, a Man's Best Friend, (2014) Gwasg Gomer, Wales: Gomer Press Limited, 
Where the Wild Cooks Go: Recipes, Music, Poetry, Cocktails, (2019) Penguin UK, 
 Under Milk Wood : Dylan Thomas illustrated for babies and children ( 2022) Wiedenfeld and Nicolson

References

External links

 Official website
 The Blues Show with Cerys Matthews (BBC Radio 2)
 Add to Playlist (BBC Radio 4)
 Cerys Matthews (BBC Radio 6 Music)
 BBC One Show profile
 
 
 August 2006 interview with Matthews
 BBC Wales Music – Matthews microsite
 

 

1969 births
Living people
20th-century Welsh women singers
21st-century Welsh women singers
Cool Cymru
Nannies
Welsh-language singers
Welsh singer-songwriters
Welsh buskers
Singers from Cardiff
Welsh Eisteddfod winners
Britpop musicians
Members of the Order of the British Empire
BBC Radio 6 Music presenters
BBC Radio 2 presenters
British women radio presenters
People educated at St Michael's School, Llanelli
Welsh domestic workers
I'm a Celebrity...Get Me Out of Here! (British TV series) participants